The State Anthem of the Republic of Karakalpakstan  The anthem was composed by Najimaddin Muxammeddinov, with lyrics written by Karakalpak poet and playwright . It was officially adopted on 24 December 1993.

Lyrics

See also
List of national anthems
State Anthem of Uzbekistan

Notes

References

Asian anthems
Regional songs
Karakalpakstan